The infinite qualitative distinction, sometimes translated as infinite qualitative difference, is a concept coined by the Danish philosopher Søren Kierkegaard. The distinction emphasizes the very different attributes of finite and temporal men and the infinite and eternal qualities of a supreme being. This concept fits into the apophatic theology tradition and therefore is fundamentally at odds with theological theories which posit a supreme being able to be fully understood by man. The theologian Karl Barth made the concept of infinite qualitative distinction a cornerstone of his theology.

Overview
For Kierkegaard, direct communication with God is impossible, as God and man are infinitely different. He argues that indirect communication with God is the only way of communication. For example, in Christian belief, the Incarnation posits that Jesus Christ is God incarnate. The infinite qualitative distinction is opposed to rational theology in the sense that, whereas the latter argues one can prove empirically Jesus is God incarnate, the former argues that empirical evidence is ultimately insufficient in making that conclusion. The paradoxical nature of the Incarnation, that God is embodied in a man, is offensive to reason, and can only be comprehended indirectly, through faith.

Barth's book The Epistle to the Romans also emphasizes such a gulf. In the preface to the Second Edition of his commentary, Barth writes, "if I have a system, it is limited to a recognition of what Kierkegaard called the 'infinite qualitative distinction' between time and eternity, and to my regarding this as possessing negative as well as positive significance: 'God is in heaven, and thou art on earth'. The relation between such a God and such a man, and the relation between such a man and such a God, is for me the theme of the Bible and the essence of philosophy."

Kierkegaard doesn't believe God is so objective toward human beings but rather that he is the absolute subjective being. He put it this way in 1846:

References

Citations

Sources

Primary texts

Secondary works
 
 



Philosophy of religion
Søren Kierkegaard
Conceptual distinctions
Karl Barth
1840s neologisms